John Platts may refer to:
 John Platts (cricketer), English cricketer
 John Platts (Unitarian), English Unitarian minister and compiler of reference works
 John Thompson Platts, British language scholar

See also
 John Platt (disambiguation)
 John Platts-Mills (1906–2001), British politician